George A. Kaftan (February 22, 1928 – October 6, 2018) was an American professional basketball player.

George grew up in New York City and went to Xavier in Manhattan before going to Holy Cross for college. Though just 6'3", Kaftan was the starting center for the College of the Holy Cross team that won the 1947 NCAA basketball tournament. In 1947 Kaftan also won Most Outstanding Player honors after averaging 21 points per game in three games.

Kaftan was selected in the second round of the 1949 BAA Draft. Kaftan later played professionally for the Boston Celtics (1949–1950), New York Knicks (1950–1952) and Baltimore Bullets (1952–1953). He averaged 7.5 points per game in his BAA/NBA career.

Kaftan is a member of the New England Basketball Hall of Fame and the Holy Cross Varsity Club Hall of Fame.

Personal
Kaftan was of Greek descent. His family's original name was Kaftagouras.

BAA/NBA career statistics

Regular season

Playoffs

References

1928 births
2018 deaths
All-American college men's basketball players
American men's basketball coaches
American men's basketball players
American people of Greek descent
Baltimore Bullets (1944–1954) players
Basketball coaches from New York (state)
Basketball players from New York City
Boston Celtics draft picks
Boston Celtics players
College men's basketball head coaches in the United States
Holy Cross Crusaders men's basketball players
LIU Post Pioneers men's basketball coaches
New York Knicks players
Small forwards
Xavier High School (New York City) alumni